Nakagawa Juria was born in Tokyo, Japan. She is a huge fashion icon in Japan. She is featured in many Japanese fashion magazines.

References

Living people
Japanese female models
1995 births